Zofia Romanowicz (born Zofia Górska; 18 October 1922 – 28 March 2010) was a Polish émigré novelist, essayist, poet, and translator and an eminent member of the Polish literary and cultural communities in exile as well as Parisian intellectual circles.

Biography
Born in Radom, Zofia Górska was 16 when World War II broke out on September 1, 1939. She stayed in Radom (Poland), where she participated in the Polish resistance (Związek Walki Zbrojnej) as a courier. Arrested together with her father by the Gestapo in January 1941, she was sentenced to death and imprisoned first in Skarżysko-Kamienne and Kielce, then in Pinczów (Poland). In April  1942, she was sent to the women’s concentration camp of Ravensbrück north of Berlin (Germany). She stayed there until September 1943, when she was assigned to one of its labor camps, Neu-Rohlau near Karlsbad (Czechoslovakia), where she worked in a porcelain factory. At the end of the war, she reached the American lines and then Rome (Italy), where she was mentored by Melchior Wańkowicz. She graduated in 1946 from the high school established in Porto San Giorgio by the Polish  II Corps.
 
She moved to Paris (France) and enrolled in romance philology studies at the Sorbonne university under the mentorship of Professor Jean Boutière. In 1948, she met Kazimierz Romanowicz (1916-2010), a former employee in the French department of the Polish bookstore company Gebethner & Wolff and an officer in the Polish II Corps. They were married in July 1948 and managed the bookstore and publishing company Libella that Kazimierz Romanowicz had founded on Ile Saint- Louis in Paris in 1946 as part of the cultural section of the Polish  II Corps. Together they founded the Galerie Lambert in 1959 next door to the bookstore. Both venues were among the most important centers of émigré Polish culture during the Cold War. A supporter of human rights and civil liberties, Zofia Romanowicz, along with 66 Polish intellectuals, signed the Letter of 59 in 1976 in protest against proposed amendments to the Polish Constitution.

She was an important cultural figure in Polish émigré circles and among Parisian intellectuals. After Libella and the Galerie Lambert closed in 1993, she continued her cultural activities in France and in Poland. She died at the Polish Retirement Home in Lilly en Val, near Orléans (France) in 2010 at age 87.

Career
Zofia Górska wrote her first poems in high school in Radom and produced several poems during her incarcerations. These poems were copied by her camp inmates into very small notebooks and carried by her to freedom. She published her first story, “Tomuś” and several of her poems from camp while in Rome with the Polish II Corps. After 1948, she used her married name, Zofia Romanowicz, to sign her works. She published several short translations and a number of short stories dealing with her war-time experiences. Her prison and camp poems were published by the in a collective volume entitled Ravensbrück. Wiersze obozowe [Ravensbrück. Camp Poems] in 1961. While studying at the Sorbonne, she became a specialist of troubadour poetry, participated in international conferences, and produced in 1963 an anthology of Provençal troubadour poetry in her Polish translation, Brewiarz miłości, which was republished in Poland in 2000.

In the mid-1950s, she started writing essays and short stories in the journals Wiadomości Literackie (London) and Kultura (Paris). Her first novel, Baśka i Barbara [Baśka and Barbara], which was inspired by her daughter and dealt with the topic of raising a bilingual/bicultural child in emigration, was first published by Libella in 1956; it was reprinted twice in Poland in 1958 where it became a favorite reading. In 1964, the Warsaw publishing house Państwowy Instytut Wydawniczy (PIW) cancelled the planned publication of her novel Szklana kula [The Snow Globe] because Kazimierz Romanowicz was sending to Poland books that were forbidden by the Communist regime. Libella published the novel in 1964, and PIW reprinted it in 2021 as part of the press’s 70th anniversary celebrations. Zofia Romanowicz’ novels were translated into English, French, German and Hebrew throughout the 1960s and earned her the Kościelski Award in 1964.

In 1965 Zofia Romanowicz published 17 short stories in the volume Próby i zamiary [Attempts and Trials] and began publishing her novels through the Polish Literary Foundation in London. After an interruption of 26 years in her publications in Poland, her novel Łagodne oko błękitu [The Blue Sweater], perhaps her most important contribution to the literature of the camps, was reprinted by the Catholic publishing house PAX in 1987 in Warsaw and received Warsaw’s Literary Fund Prize for the most important literary novelistic achievement. After the end of the Cold War in 1989, as the émigré and local Polish writing communities reunited, she published her last two novels, Ruchome schody [The Escalator] and Trybulacje proboszcza P. [The Tribulations of Priest P.] in Poland. She became a collaborator of Tygodnik Solidarności in 1991 and of Odra in 1999, and her articles and essays also appeared also in Tygodnik Powszechny and Nowa Kultura.

Zofia Romanowicz made major contributions to European literature during the second half of the 20th century. Even though she was forbidden to return to her homeland and to publish in Poland during the early postwar years, she maintained literary contacts there. Her publications in the émigré milieu and in Poland are a mirror of the political and cultural ups and downs of the Cold War. She wrote in Polish but on more than one occasion penned the first draft of the French translations of her works. In 1976, she became a member of the jury for the annual literary prize given by Wiadomości Literackie in London. She was a member of the Union of Polish Writers in Exile from 1946 to 1989 and a member of the Union of Polish Writers from 1989 to 2010.

Honors and awards
1960    Przejście przez Morze Czerwone [Passage Through the Red Sea] named best book of the year published in emigration by Radio Free Europe

1964    Kościelski Award

1966    Próby i zamiary [Attempts and Trials] receives “Wiadomiści Literackie” Award for best Polish book published in emigration in 1965

1971    Alfred Jurzykowski Prize for the totality of her work

1973    Groby Napoleona [Napoleon’s Tombs] named best book of 1972 published in emigration by Radio Free Europe

1976    Gold Medal for the totality of her poetic work, given by the Friends of Polish Art in Detroit on the occasion of their 200th anniversary

1981    Skrytki [Places of Oblivion] receives from the Union of Polish Writers in Exile the Hermina Naglerowa Prize for best book published in emigration in 1980

1985    Skrytki [Places of Oblivion] receives the Zygmunt Hertz Prize awarded by the Literary Institute of Maisons-Laffitte

1987    Łagodne oko błękitu [The Blue Sweater] receives the Literary Fund’s (Warsaw) Prize for the most important literary novelistic achievement of the year

1988    Laureate of the Union of Polish Writers’ Prize for the totality of her work

1994    Cavalier Cross of the Polish Republic’s Order of Merit

1994    Diploma from the Minister of Foreign Affairs of the Polish republic for outstanding contributions to Polish culture

1994    Publishers’ Prize of the Polish PEN-Club

1994    Honorary Distinction of the Polish Association of Book Publishers

2000    Prize for Literature of the Polish Ministry of Culture and National Heritage

Publications
Brewiarz miłości. Warsaw: Ossolineum, 1963.

Baśka i Barbara. Paris, Libella, 1956. Warsaw: PIW, 1958.

Przejście przez Morze Czerwone. Paris, Libella, 1960. Warsaw: PIW, 1961.

Ravensbrück. Wiersze obozowe. Warsaw: Zarząd główny, Klub Ravensbrück, 1961.

Słońce dziesięciu linii. Paris, Libella, 1963.

Szklana kula. Paris, Libella, 1964. Warsaw: PIW, 2021.

Próby i zamiary. London, Polska Fundacja Literacka, 1965.

Łagodne oko błękitu. Paris: Libella, 1968. Warsaw: PAX, 1987. Audio book, Warsaw, Zakład nagrań i Wydawnictw Związku Niewidomych, Pax, 1989.

Groby Napoleona. London, Polska Fundacja Literacka, 1972.

Sono felice. London, Polska Fundacja Literacka, 1977.

Skrytki. Paris: Instytut Literacki, 1980.

Na wyspie. Paris: Instytut Literacki, 1984.

Ruchome schody. Warsaw: PIW, 1995.

Trubadurzy prowansalscy: liryki najpiękniejsze. Edited by Jerzy Kapica. Reprint of Brewiarz miłości. Toruń: Algo, 2000.

Trybulacje proboszcza P. Toruń, Archiwum emigracji, 2001.

Translations
Passage Through the Red Sea. Translated by Virgilia Peterson.New York, NY: Harcourt Brace, 1962.

Le Passage de la Mer Rouge. Traduit par Georges Lisowski. Paris: Seuil, 1961.

Der Zug durchs Rote Meer. Berlin: Suhrkampf, 1962, 2nd edition in 1964. Reprinted in 1982, 1992, and 1996.

Edhe një ditë shprese. Translation of fragments of Passage Through the Red Sea by Eqrem Basha. Macedonia: Rilindja, 1978.

Ha-ma’abar b-Yam Sup. Translation of Passage Through the Red Sea by Ada Pagis. Tel Aviv: Hoca’ah Am Obed, 1995.

Tricoul albastru. Bucarest, Albatros, 1973.

Le Chandail bleu. Translated by the author and Jean-Louis Faivre d’Arcier. Paris: Seuil, 1971.

Île Saint-Louis. Translated by Erik Veaux. Paris: Editions du Rocher, 2002.

“Les galettes de pommes de terre.” Traduit par Alice-Catherine Carls. Les Cahiers bleus, Printemps 1983. pp. 63–65.

“Oubliettes. Chapitre XV.” Adapté par l’auteur avec la collaboration de Patrick Waldberg. Cahiers de l’Est, No. 18-19, 1979. pp. 159–176.

“The Screen.” Translated by Jan Solecki. The Antioch Review, Vol. 20, No. 3 (Autumn, 1960). pp. 347–364.  https://www.jstor.org/stable/4610272

References
“Zofia Romanowicz, la plus française des écrivains polonais du XXe siècle.” Revue de Litterature Comparée. 28 août 2019.

Anna Jamrozek-Sowa. Życie powtórzone. O pisarstwie Zofii Romanowiczowej. Rzeszów. Biblioteka Frazy, 2008.

Arkadiusz Morawiec. “O recepcji Baśki i Barbary Zofii Romanowiczowej “ [On the Reception of Baśka i Barbara by Zofia Romanowicz]. Białostockie Studia Literaturoznawcze, No. 6, 2015. pp. 99–120.

Arkadiusz Morawiec. Zofia Romanowiczowa. Pisarka nie tylko emigracyjna. Łódż: Wydawnictwo Universytetu Łódzkiego, 2016.

Mirosław A Supruniuk, ed. Libella – Galerie Lambert. Toruń, Uniwersytet Mikołaja Kopernika, 1998.

Zofia Romanowicz. Directed by Tadeusz Śmiarowski. Documentary, 2008.

Alice-Catherine Carls. “The Renaissance of Zofia Romanowicz.” World Literature Today, September 13, 2016. 

Alice-Catherine Carls. “Staging, Philosophizing, Witnessing: The Aesthetics of Brokenness in Zofia Romanowicz’s Work.” The Polish Review, Vol. 47, No. 1 (2002), pp. 3–10.

Alice-Catherine Carls. “In memoriam : Felicja Zofia Górska-Romanowicz (1922-2010).” Archiwum Emigracji : studia, szkice, dokumenty 1-2 (12-13), 2010. pp. 343–345.

Erik Veaux. “Zofia Romanowiczowa (1922-2010).” Archiwum Emigracji : studia, szkice, dokumenty, 1-2 (12-13). pp. 336–342.

Maria Hernandez-Paluch. 40 lat ‘Libelli’.” Kultura (Paris), No. 12/471, 1986. pp. 101–106.

References

External links
The archives of her work can be found in the Emigration Archive of the University of Torun Library. 

1922 births
2010 deaths
People from Radom
Writers from Paris
Home Army members
Female resistance members of World War II
Polish emigrants to France
Polish translators
Polish women writers
Polish female soldiers
Flossenbürg concentration camp survivors
Ravensbrück concentration camp survivors
20th-century translators
20th-century women writers
20th-century Polish women
People associated with the magazine "Kultura"